The South African Railways Class 25NC 4-8-4 of 1953 was a class of steam locomotives built between 1953 and 1955 for the South African Railways (SAR). The Class 25NC was the non-condensing version of the Class 25 condensing locomotive, of which ninety were placed in service at the same time. Between 1973 and 1980, all but three of the condensing locomotives were converted to non-condensing and also designated Class 25NC.

Manufacturers

The Class 25NC non-condensing and Class 25 condensing 4-8-4 Northern type steam locomotives were designed by the South African Railways (SAR) under the direction of LC Grubb, Chief Mechanical Engineer of the SAR from 1949 to 1954, in conjunction with Henschel & Son of Kassel in Germany who designed the condensing apparatus and the condensing tender of the Class 25 sister locomotive. Between 1953 and 1955,eleven Class 25NC locomotives were built by the North British Locomotive Company (NBL) and numbered in the range from 3401 to 3411 while 39 locomotives were built by Henschel and numbered in the range from 3412 to 3450.

Characteristics
The Class 25NC was superheated and used piston valves actuated by Walschaerts valve gear. Timken roller bearings were used throughout, including on the three-axle tender bogies, the coupling and connecting rods as well as the crosshead gudgeon pins, while the locomotive's leading bogies and coupled wheels had Cannon-type axle boxes. Compared to earlier SAR practice, a novelty was the adoption of mechanical lubrication. A sixteen-feed lubricator was driven off the expansion link trunnion. The cylinders and frames were cast in one piece by Commonwealth Steel Company in the United States. The steel cylinders and steam chests were fitted with cast iron liners. Being entirely mounted on roller bearings, very little effort was required to move these locomotives.

The Alligator type crossheads were split on the vertical centre line and clamped on to the end of the piston rods, which had three coned rings engaging in grooves in the crossheads. The original coupling rods differed from the usual in being three separate rods, thereby doing away with four knuckle joints and pins.

The multiple-valve superheater header was of the Melesco type. The boiler was fitted with four Ross-pop safety valves, each  in diameter, and two Hopkinson boiler blowdown cocks on the firebox wrapper, one on each side.

The locomotive was equipped with a Type EW1 tender which was equipped with a mechanical stoker of which the engine was mounted on the tender. The tender frame was also a one-piece steel casting and was a water-bottom frame, with the frame itself forming the bottom of the tank instead of being a separate tank and frame as in previous designs.

Teething troubles
Soon after entering service, problems were experienced with failing connecting rods, big end bearings breaking up as well as cracks developing in the motion girder of the Alligator crossheads. After investigations by SAR engineers with assistance from the South African Council for Scientific and Industrial Research, the crossheads, slide bars and coupling rods were modified. The crossheads were converted to the multiple-bearing type with single guide bars while the three independent coupling rods were replaced with the more conventional single coupling rod with knuckle joints.

When new, the tapered Timken crankpin roller bearings soon became notorious for throwing their lubricant onto the underside of the boiler, from where it ran down to the lowest point and dripped onto the coupled wheel tyres along the way. This manufacturer's fault also applied to the Class 25 and was one of the reasons for the reputation of both classes of being slippery. Timken managed to resolve the problem before all their bearings had been replaced, but by then about two-thirds of the locomotives had already been fitted with redesigned coupling rods with SKF crankpin ball bearings.

Service

The Class 25NC initially served on the unelectrified mainlines from De Aar via Kimberley to Welverdiend. They were pooled from their introduction and were run through from De Aar to Welverdiend and vice versa, recoaling at Warrenton. After electrification was extended from Welverdiend to Klerksdorp, they ran from there to De Aar, still recoaling at Warrenton. Later they also worked from Kimberley via Bloemfontein to Harrismith in the Free State while some joined the Class 25 condensers on the line from De Aar via Beaufort West to Touws River.

When the line south from De Aar was dieselised between 1973 and 1974, the Class 25 condensers working there were moved north to work the section from De Aar to Kimberley, where they replaced twenty-two Class 25NCs which were then relocated to Bethlehem in the Free State. From 1982, Class 25NCs also replaced Class 19Ds and Class GMAM Garratts on the line from Warrenton via Vryburg to Mafeking.

Class 25 rebuilding

Along with the Class 25NC, ninety Class 25 condensing locomotives were built as part of the same order, one by Henschel and the rest by NBL. The condensing apparatus for these engines and their condensing tenders were designed and patented by Henschel.

Between 1973 and 1980, all but three of the ninety Class 25 condensers were converted to non-condensing locomotives and reclassified to Class 25NC, the exceptions being numbers 3451, 3511 and 3540. The number plates of some were copied and recast with the additional "NC" for "non-condensing" squeezed in next to the existing "25", which resulted in a lopsided class indication on their cabside plates. Locomotives with all four characters neatly in line and centred were therefore usually identifiable as original Class 25NCs.

In the process, their Type CZ condensing tenders were also rebuilt to ordinary coal-and-water Type EW2 tenders by removing the condensing radiators and roof fans and replacing it with a massive water tank. Since the Type CZ tenders were built on single cast steel water-bottom frames it was impractical to attempt to shorten them, which resulted in the rebuilt Type EW2 tenders with their long round-topped water tanks. Locomotives with these rebuilt tenders were soon nicknamed Worshond (Sausage dog or Dachshund).

The Class 26 Red Devil
Between 1979 and 1981 no. 3450, the last Class 25NC to be built, was rebuilt to the sole Class 26, the Red Devil, at the SAR workshops at Salt River, Cape Town. The primary objectives of the project were to improve the combustion and steaming rate, to reduce the emission of wasteful black smoke and to overcome the problem of clinkering.

This was achieved by the use of a Gas Producer Combustion System, which relies on the gasification of coal on a low temperature firebed so that the gases are then fully burnt above the firebed. These extensive modifications justified reclassification and the locomotive became the first and only Class 26, although the locomotive's original Class 25NC number was retained.

Preservation
The following is a list of 25NC and 26 class that have survived into preservation.

Most are still owned by the Transnet Heritage Foundation. None except the class 25Nc 3437 & 25Nc 3482 (and it only for the winter months) are mainline certified as of 1 January 2019.

Project Zimbabwe
During 1988 a severe motive power shortage was experienced by the National Railways of Zimbabwe and discussions with South Africa revealed that numerous class 25NC 4-8-4, had been recently withdrawn from service and were available for either hire or purchase. NRZ decided to investigate the purchase of 20 to 25 of these locomotives for a short-term basis. A team of three were sent down from Bulawayo inspected 50 locomotives at Warrenton and De Aar.

A list of 28 locomotives was submitted from which it would be possible to choose 20 to 25, or any lesser number which might be needed

Category A (locomotives with 5 or more years before heavy overhaul)

3404, 3410, 3422, 3428, 3438, 3442, 3445, 3453, 3457, 3459, 3479, 3504, 3508, 3519

Category B (needing heavy repairs by 1993–1994)

3412, 3424, 3464, 3473, 3475, 3490, 3498, 3507, 3518, 3520, 3537

Category C (needing heavy repairs by 1992)

3439, 3446, 3515

The project did not materialise but several did survive into preservation.

Works numbers
The locomotive numbers, builders and works numbers are listed in the table. On the builders' works lists, all the locomotives are shown as having been built in 1953. All tenders bore the same works number as the engines they were built with, except the sixty tenders which were built by Henschel for condensing engines which were built by NBL. These sixty tenders were allocated Henschel works numbers.

>

Illustration

References

External links

Cape gauge railway locomotives
Henschel locomotives
25NC
NBL locomotives
Railway locomotives introduced in 1953
25NC
4-8-4 locomotives